The Monster of the Mangones is the name given to an unidentified Colombian serial killer who, between the 1960s and 1970s, murdered between 30 to 38 preadolescent and teenage boys in Cali. Believed to be a native of the city, he would kidnap and later kill most of his victims in various remote vacant lots.

At the time, it was the most notorious criminal case in the country's history. For some, the Monster was a simple myth or legend, while others believe that he actually existed, later earning comparisons with Luis Garavito.

His modus operandi consisted of inserting needles into the heart and thorax, assaults, rapes and torture. It is believed that he used syringes to draw blood from his victims. The killer was described as a true sexual sadist, and possible sufferer of clinical vampirism.

History 
During the 1960s, citizens of Cali lived in fear and uncertainty, as children and adolescents began disappearing from the area. On November 5, 1963, the body of a paperboy was found in western Cali. After that, more cases of murdered young boys began cropping up, the bodies discarded in a type of urban alley known as mangones. On December 4th, another boy was found on some grassland in the northern area of the city, in what is considered the second recorded homicide. Eight days later, a third body, lacking eyeballs, was discovered on the shores of the Aguacatal River. Two more bodies were discovered before the end of the year: one near the railway station and the other in Prados del Norte.

At the end of the year, five murders were recorded between November and December, all of the similar in their brutality. In January 1964, Cali police found the mummified body of another boy; two days after, the remains of 12-year-old Alberto Garzón were discovered. Another three corpses were found in the same month, in different sectors of the town. Between February and April, there were an additional three murders: one very close to Tequendama, another in Puerto Mallarino and the last at a potrero.

Faced with this wave of murders, the authorities sent a series of notices to the public, claiming that these bodies were likely taken from cemeteries and later scattered around Cali, mostly in solitary areas. Despite this, much of the press and public demanded that the killings be solved, and the terror finally put to an end.

The crimes ceased for several months, although more cases were reported again in late 1964. All of these events are believed to have claimed the lives of between 30 to 38 young boys and men. The perpetrator was never captured, and he was later nicknamed the "Monster of the Mangones".

Film adaptation 
The case led to the creation of a film titled Pura sangre, by director Luis Ospina. The story tells about a man who needs fresh blood from children and teenagers, as he suffered from a peculiar disease. The film was released in 1982, with most of the scenes shot in Cali and one in New York City; it cost 16 million Colombian pesos, and premiered at the Cartagena Film Festival, where it was considered the "first Colombian horror film with international quality".

The film also touches on issues related to vampirism, as it is about an individual who needs to ingest blood in order to survive.

See also 
 List of fugitives from justice who disappeared
 List of serial killers in Colombia

References

Bibliography 
 
 
 
 
 
 
 

1960s crimes in South America
1970s crimes in South America
Colombian murderers of children
Colombian rapists
Colombian serial killers
Murder in Colombia
Unidentified serial killers
Vampirism (crime)